Three on a Match is a 1932 American pre-Code crime drama released by Warner Bros. The film was directed by Mervyn LeRoy and stars Joan Blondell, Warren William, Ann Dvorak and Bette Davis.  The film also features Lyle Talbot, Humphrey Bogart, Allen Jenkins and Edward Arnold.

Plot
Three women who went to the same New York City elementary school, Mary, Ruth, and Vivian, meet again as young adults after some time apart. They each light a cigarette from the same match and discuss the superstition that such an act is unlucky and that Vivian, the last to light her cigarette, will be the first to die.

Mary is a show girl who has established stability in her life after spending some time in a reform school, while Ruth works as a stenographer. Vivian is the best off of the three, married to successful lawyer, Robert Kirkwood, with a young son, Robert Jr., but she has grown dissatisfied with her life and so decides to take a trip to Europe with her little boy.

Just before Vivian and Junior's ship is about to set sail, Mary boards the ocean liner with two men to attend a bon voyage party for some friends. Gambler Michael Loftus, one of the two men, flirts with Vivian. She's smitten with him and he persuades her to run away with him. Minutes before the ship leaves port, Vivian gathers up her son and the three disembark from the boat.

Vivian and Michael Loftus live a very shabby and rather dissolute life, so that Mary, concerned about Vivian's neglect of her son, tells Robert (nearly mad about the disappearance of the boy) where to find him. Both Mary and Ruth are very fond of Junior and Robert has fallen in love with Mary. He proposes to her and hires Ruth to look after the child. Mary and Robert marry the same day his divorce from Vivian becomes final.

Meanwhile, Vivian has become a hopeless drug addict and has spent all of her money. Additionally, Michael owes $2,000 to gangster Ace, who tells him to pay up or else. Desperate, Michael tries to blackmail Robert by threatening to inform the press about Mary's criminal background. Robert refuses to pay because he is already aware of Mary's checkered past; so instead, Michael kidnaps Junior to demand a ransom to pay his debt. Ace's thugs find the child with Michael and Vivian in their apartment where Junior joins his mother in her bedroom. The thugs are delighted and send a demand for a much larger ransom of $25,000.

Vivian begins having withdrawals. One of the gangsters, while out trying to score a fix for her, sees policemen in the neighborhood going door to door searching for the kidnapped boy. The gangsters decide to kill the child before the police arrive, but Michael balks at the plan, especially since he's the one who's been ordered to do the dirty deed.  Enraged, the gangsters kill Michael.

In the meantime, Vivian has overheard the plot to kill Junior and is determined to save her son's life at all costs. She tells Junior to hide under the bed, then scrawls a message in lipstick on the front of her nightgown that relays the boy's whereabouts. Just as the gangsters are coming through her bedroom door,  she jumps out of the fourth-floor window, killing herself but resulting in the boy's rescue. Mary and Ruth, at home after all is resolved, symbolically light their cigarettes from the same match and then throw it down onto the hearthstone, where the flame goes out.

Cast
 Virginia Davis as Mary Keaton as a child
 Joan Blondell as Mary Keaton / Mary Bernard
 Anne Shirley (credited as Dawn O'Day) as Vivian Revere as a child
 Ann Dvorak as Vivian Revere Kirkwood
 Betty Carse as Ruth Westcott as a child
 Bette Davis as Ruth Westcott
 Warren William as Robert Kirkwood
 Lyle Talbot as Michael Loftus
 Humphrey Bogart as Harve
 Allen Jenkins as Dick
 Edward Arnold as Ace
 Frankie Darro as Bobby
 Glenda Farrell as Mrs. Black
 Buster Phelps as Robert Jr.
 Grant Mitchell as Mr. Gilmore, school principal

Production
Dvorak was the last of the four principal actors to be cast. This was Bogart's first appearance as a hoodlum type, although his work in Midnight (released 1934) preceded this role and led to his being cast by LeRoy.

Filming took place in June 1932.

When this film was released in October 1932, the Lindbergh kidnapping was very much in the news and the kidnappers had not yet been caught. The kidnapping of a child in the story raised concerns with censors, but Jason Joy of the Studio Relations Committee successfully made a case for the film to the censors in New York, Ohio, Pennsylvania and Maryland.

Promotion
Joan Blondell posed for a risqué 1932 promotional publicity photo for the film which was later banned under the Motion Picture Production Code.

Reception
Three on a Match received tepid to poor notices overall. Mordaunt Hall of the New York Times called Three on a Match "tedious and distasteful" as well as "unintelligent". The Time reviewer felt the film did not carry much weight, unlike previous Glasmon–Bright productions, and that the suicide at the end was more implausible than tragic. Kaspar Monahan of the Pittsburgh Press thought that it began with the hope of being "different" but ultimately devolved into a "gangster yarn" and summarized: "Direction good for the most part; acting as good as can be expected under the circumstances; story erratic."

The Spokane Spokesman-Review expressed admiration for the way the passage of time is shown through several montage sequences, calling it "a brand new approach and treatment ..." and commented that the film "rang true".

Trade paper reviews advised exhibitors to focus on the cast: "An attractive cast array is the attendance motive for this picture which is surprising in its meager demands upon its quartet of featured people" was the opening comment of Varietys  Sid Silverman. The Film Daily review, too, said the "cast helps" with a plot that has "too many turns". The Motion Picture Herald also advised exhibitors to focus on the "strength of the cast names" and not to even use the word "kidnaping" or allude to it in promotions.

Decades after its release, the film found more favor with critics and film historians. In 1969, William K. Everson called it "unusually carefully-made" and wrote, "Splendidly cut and paced ... and climaxed by a real shocker, Three on a Match is still a vivid little picture". Wheeler Winston Dixon observed, "the film is astonishing for the amount of information that LeRoy manages to compress into this lightning fast tale". It has been pointed to as Dvorak's best performance for Warners.

Leonard Maltin gives the film three out of four stars, describing it as a “Fine, fast-moving (and surprisingly potent) pre-Code melodrama of three girls who renew childhood friendship, only to find suspense and tragedy. Dvorak is simply marvelous.”

Three on a Match holds an 80% rating on Rotten Tomatoes based on five reviews.

In 1938 Warner Bros. released Broadway Musketeers, a remake of Three on a Match.

References
Informational notes

Citations

External links

 
 
 
 

1932 films
1932 crime drama films
American crime drama films
American black-and-white films
1930s English-language films
Films directed by Mervyn LeRoy
Films produced by Darryl F. Zanuck
Films set in the 1910s
Films set in the 1920s
Warner Bros. films
Films with screenplays by Kubec Glasmon
1930s American films